Addison Township is one of fourteen townships in Shelby County, Indiana. As of the 2010 census, its population was 20,585 and it contained 9,237 housing units.

Addison Township was organized in 1823.

Geography

Cities and towns
 Shelbyville

Unincorporated towns
 Beech Brook
 Knighthood Grove
 Meiks
 Rolling Ridge
 Walkerville

References

External links
 Indiana Township Association
 United Township Association of Indiana

Townships in Shelby County, Indiana
Townships in Indiana